Göran Daniel "Dani" Martinez Olsson (born 9 January 1973) is a Swedish former footballer (midfielder). He played for Djurgårdens IF, Racing Club de Ferrol, Elche, Guadix, Universidad, Ceuta, Linense, and Puerto Real. He played 19 Allsvenskan matches for Djurgårdens IF. He appeared 11 times for the Sweden U17 team.

References

Swedish footballers
Swedish expatriate footballers
Allsvenskan players
Segunda División B players
Djurgårdens IF Fotboll players
Racing de Ferrol footballers
Elche CF players
Universidad de Las Palmas CF footballers
AD Ceuta footballers
Expatriate footballers in Spain
1973 births
Living people
Association football midfielders
Footballers from Stockholm